Kazimierz Wielikosielec (Kazimir Vialikaselets; born May 5, 1945) is a Belarusian prelate of the Catholic Church and a Dominican. Since 1992, he has been the Vicar General and Dean of the Diocese of Pinsk deanery in Baranavichy, and since 1999 an auxiliary bishop of the Diocese of Pinsk. In January 2021, he was appointed Apostolic Administrator of the Archdiocese of Minsk–Mohilev.

Vialikaselets was born in the village Staravolia, Pruzhany District. In 1981, he was admitted to the seminary in Riga. While studying at the seminary, he joined the Order of Dominican Fathers. After graduating from the seminary in 1984, Vialikaselets was ordained a priest by Cardinal Julijans Vaivods and was directed to his first parish of the Holy Trinity in Ishkaldz, Brest Region, Belarus. Because in those days lacked the priests, he also oversaw Catholic parishes in several neighbouring villages located in Hrodna Region and Minsk Region. In addition to the pastoral ministry of Father Vialikaselets dealt with the reconstruction and renovation of temples.

In 1992 he was appointed Vicar General of the Diocese of Pinsk, while performing duties of dean of the Baranavichy Decanate and pastor of the Church of the Holy Cross in Baranavichy.

On June 24, 1999, Kazimir Vialikaselets was consecrated Bishop at the Cathedral of Pinsk by Cardinal Kazimir Sviontak.

On January 3, 2020, Vialikasieliets was appointed Apostolic Administrator of the Roman Catholic Archdiocese of Minsk–Mohilev following the resignation of Archbishop Tadevush Kandrusevich.

References

External links
 Catholic.by
 Catholic.by
 Catholic-hierarchy.org

21st-century Roman Catholic bishops in Belarus
1945 births
Living people
Dominican bishops